The Miss Virgin Islands' Outstanding Teen competition is the pageant that previously selected the representative for the U.S. Virgin Islands in the Miss America's Outstanding Teen pageant. There has not been a representative from the U.S. Virgin Islands at the national pageant since 2015.

Results summary
The year in parentheses indicates the year of the Miss America's Outstanding Teen competition the award/placement was garnered.

Placements
 Top 10: CeReyna Jade Bougouneau (2015)

Awards
 America's Choice Award: CeReyna Jade Bougouneau (2015)

Winners

References

U.S. Virgin Islands
United States Virgin Islands culture
Beauty pageants in the United States Virgin Islands